"I Know You Rider" (also "Woman Blues" and "I Know My Rider") is a traditional blues song that has been adapted by numerous artists.  Modern versions can be traced back to Blind Lemon Jefferson's "Deceitful Brownskin Blues", which was released as a single in 1927. It appears in a 1934 book, American Ballads and Folk Songs, by the noted father-and-son musicologists and folklorists John Lomax and Alan Lomax. The book notes that "An eighteen-year old black girl, in prison for murder, sang the song and the first stanza of these blues." The Lomaxes then added a number of verses from other sources and named it "Woman Blue".  The music and melody are similar to Lucille Bogan's "B.D. Woman Blues" (c. 1935), although the lyrics are completely different.
 
In the mid-1950s, traditional musician Bob Coltman found the song in the Lomax book, arranged it and began singing it frequently around Philadelphia and New England circa 1957-1960.  In 1959, Coltman taught it to Tossi Aaron who recorded it in 1960 for her LP Tossi Sings Folk Songs & Ballads on Prestige International.  Joan Baez recorded a version for her 1960 debut album on Vanguard Records but the track was not released until 2001.  Throughout the early 1960s, the song gained popularity through folk performers, most notably the Kingston Trio, who included the song "Rider" on their album Sunny Side! in 1963. So did the Big 3, an American folk trio that featured Cass Elliot. Folk singer Judy Roderick also recorded an influential version of the song under the title "Woman Blue" and it became the title track of her second album, recorded and released by Vanguard in 1965.  British folk singer John Renbourn recorded a version of the song (titled "I Know My Babe") and it was included on his 1967 solo album, Another Monday.

By the mid-1960s, rock acts had begun to record the song. Well known versions include those by the Grateful Dead, Janis Joplin, James Taylor (as "Circle Round the Sun", on James Taylor), the Seldom Scene and Hot Tuna.  the Astronauts released a version on their 1967 album Travelin' Men. The Byrds recorded the song during 1966, under the title "I Know My Rider (I Know You Rider)", but their version remained unreleased until 1987, when it was included on Never Before.  The Byrds' version was later included as a bonus track on the expanded CD edition of their Fifth Dimension album. The Byrds also performed the song at the Monterey Pop Festival, though that  performance of "I Know My Rider (I Know You Rider)" has never been officially released. The Dutch progressive rock band Galaxy-Lin released an influential version of the song (titled "I Know My Baby") on their 1975 album, G.

The song was also covered by reggae/rock fusion artists Slightly Stoopid on their 2008 album Slightly Not Stoned Enough to Eat Breakfast Yet Stoopid and Big House on their 2008 Never Ending Train album. It has also been partially covered by experimental folk band Akron/Family.

Other renditions

"I Know You Rider" was also a staple of the Grateful Dead's live shows.  It was the first song that bass player Phil Lesh rehearsed with the band upon joining.  However, Lesh was not confident enough in his own singing abilities to handle the song's lead vocal.  During the Grateful Dead's live concerts, it was usually performed as the second half of a medley with "China Cat Sunflower".  This segue was later used by Bruce Hornsby and the Range, with "I Know You Rider" following their song, "The Red Plains".

The International Tussler Society, a band of key members of the Norwegian prog-rock band Motorpsycho, has also recorded a version, available on the album The Tussler - Original Motion Picture Soundtrack. The album was the soundtrack to a fictional Spaghetti Western by non-existent director Theo Buhara. Its Country Rock sound marked a drastic departure from the earlier Motorpsycho records, which were hard-rocking.

Marty Stuart and His Fabulous Superlatives often opened their concerts with "I Know You(r) Rider" between 2015 and 2017, and continued to perform it live as of late 2021.

References

External links
 Anthology of American Folk Music, Smithsonian Institution

Blues songs
Grateful Dead songs
The Byrds songs